Jim Golliday was a sprinter, 100 yards/meters. He was the United States 100 yards champion in 1951.

Career

Originally a champion school football player at Wendell Phillips High School in Chicago, Golliday did not take track and field seriously until his senior year in 1949, winning the Illinois school's 100 yard title.

As a student at Northwestern University, Golliday was USA champion in the 100 yard sprint in 1951.

He was considered the favorite for the 100 meters title at the 1952 Helsinki Olympics but injury denied him a chance to compete.

A win in the 1952 NCAA 100 yards event showed he was in good early season form (10.4 s into a stiff wind). However, the recurrence of a muscle injury suffered in a semi-final of the 1952 AAU meet meant that he hobbled out of his heat at the 1952 US Olympic Trials. Lindy Remigino, the winner of 100 meters title at the 1952 Olympics, magnanimously stated that "of course, Jimmy Golliday was the favorite in the trials. I think he was the fastest of us all".

In 1952 he entered the United States Army, and competed on service teams in Europe, before returning to the United States and Northwestern University in 1954.

In 1955, he matched the world record for the 100 yards at 9.3 seconds.

In 1956, he set an indoors world record for the 60 yards dash., but injury again denied him a chance to compete at the 1956 Melbourne Olympics. He trailed in last in his semi-final of the 100 meters due to a muscle injury - another occurrence of the type of injury that plagued him throughout his career.

After retirement, he lived in California selling insurance, before returning to Chicago because of ill health.

He died in 1971, aged only 39. The cause of death was listed as pneumonia, a condition he suffered as a complication following surgery for ulcers at Downey Veterans Hospital in Illinois.

World rankings

Golliday was voted by the experts at Track and Field News to be ranked among the best in the US and the world in the 100 yards/meters sprint event in the period from 1951 to 1955.

References

Further reading
 Duncanson, Neil, "The Fastest Men on Earth", Andre Deutsch, 2011.
 R L Quercetani & G Pallicca, "A World History of Sprint Racing 1850-2005", SEP Editrice Srl, 2006.

1931 births
1971 deaths
American male sprinters
World record setters in athletics (track and field)
Track and field athletes from Sacramento, California
Northwestern Wildcats men's track and field athletes
USA Outdoor Track and Field Championships winners